Florence Bellows Baker Loew (1876–1936) was an American horsewoman, philanthropist, and award winning horticulturist.

She was born in 1876, the daughter of George Fisher Baker, a wealthy banker. On April 12, 1898, she married William Goadby Loew at All Souls' Unitarian Church in New York City. 

She died on May 24, 1936, in her townhouse at 56 East 93rd Street in New York City. The mansion is now known as the William Goadby Loew House. She is buried with her husband at Locust Valley Cemetery in Locust Valley, New York.

References

External links

1876 births
1936 deaths
American horticulturists
American racehorse owners and breeders
American socialites
American Unitarian Universalists
American women philanthropists
Florence